See also the 195 S sports racer
The Ferrari 195 Inter is a sportscar produced by Ferrari in 1950 as a grand tourer (GT) version of the Ferrari 195 S racer.

Introduced at the 1950 Paris Motor Show, it was similar to the 166 Inter shown a year earlier and was aimed at the same affluent clientele. 27 were built in less than a year, receiving the odd-numbered chassis numbers. Out of the 28 cars, 13 were bodied by Carrozzeria Vignale, 11 by Carrozzeria Ghia, 3 by Carrozzeria Touring and 1 by Motto.

The more-potent (but otherwise similar) Ferrari 212 Inter was introduced at the 1951 Paris Motor Show and replaced the 195 Inter.

The engine increase was accomplished by pushing the bore from 60 to 65 mm, retaining the 58.8 mm stroke. A single Weber 36DCF carburettor was normally fitted, for a total output of  though some used triple carbs.

Gallery

References

Bibliography 
 

195 Inter
Sports cars
Cars introduced in 1950